Tor tambroides, known as empurau in Malay, is a species of mahseer native to Southeast Asia.

Taxonomy
It has been suggested that the species represents a junior synonym of Tor tambra. T. tambra, T. tambroides and T. douronensis may be synonymous.

Distribution
These fish have been found throughout Southeast Asia, ranging from Thailand in the Chao Phraya and Mekong River basins to the Greater Sunda Islands. The species has been reported in Burma.
The type locality of Tor tambroides is the Indonesian island of Sumatra.

Ecology
The species is omnivorous, sometimes eating toxic fruits when the streams it inhabits flood the forest; this may make them temporarily inedible. During the rainy season, juveniles migrate downstream. After 2 months, matured adults travel back upstream to spawn at the headwaters in the dry season.

Conservation
While the species is not currently assigned a conservation status by the IUCN due to lack of data, overfishing is assumed to threaten the wild population. The empurau, as the species is known in Malaysia, is reportedly the most expensive edible fish in the country and has been known to fetch up to RM1800 per kilogram of the fish.

Aquaculture
Empurau can be grown in captivity. The fish require moving, well-oxygenated water. They should be fed on various fruits and seeds to simulate their natural diet. Artificial hormones may be necessary to induce reproduction.

References

External links
 Empurau – king of the river
 https://www.mahseertrust.org/

Fish of Thailand
Cyprinid fish of Asia
Fish described in 1854
Taxa named by Pieter Bleeker